Cooper Johns (born 14 July 1999) is a professional rugby league footballer who currently plays as a  and  for the Manly Sea Eagles in the National Rugby League (NRL).

Background
He is the son of former Newcastle Knights player Matthew Johns, nephew of Andrew Johns and younger brother of current Newcastle knights player Jack Johns. 

Cooper was educated at  St Augustine's College, Sydney and represented the NSW CIS team. He played his junior rugby league with the Narraweena Hawks before signing with Manly-Warringah Sea Eagles, where he played S. G. Ball Cup as part of Manly's development squad. He would transfer to Melbourne Storm at the end of 2017, where he was allocated to play with the Sunshine Coast Falcons in the Queensland Cup.

Career

2020
Johns made his first grade debut in round 15 of the 2020 NRL season for the Melbourne Storm against Parramatta which ended in a 14-0 loss at Bankwest Stadium. He had his Melbourne jersey (cap number 204) presented to him by Craig Bellamy with his father Matty Johns and his mother present via zoom.

2022
Despite being released by Melbourne at the end of the 2022 NRL season, he was called up to the Italian national side for the 2021 Rugby League World Cup. Following his initial selection, Johns did not travel to the tournament. On 18 November, Johns signed a contract to join Manly-Warringah starting in 2023.

2023
He signed a 1 year deal with Manly-Warringah Sea Eagles under a train and trial contract.

References

External links
Melbourne Storm profile 

QRL profile 

1999 births
Living people
Australian people of Italian descent
Australian rugby league players
Melbourne Storm players
Manly Warringah Sea Eagles players
Rugby league halfbacks
Rugby league players from Newcastle, New South Wales
Sunshine Coast Falcons players